Rosenfeld is a local urban district within the Rural Municipality of Rhineland in the Canadian province of Manitoba. It is recognized as a designated place by Statistics Canada.

History 
Rosenfeld was founded as a train station in 1882. It achieved unincorporated village status in 1949 and then local urban district status in 1996.

Demographics 

See also 
List of communities in Manitoba
List of designated places in Manitoba
List of local urban districts in Manitoba

References 

Designated places in Manitoba
Local urban districts in Manitoba